Arzenc-de-Randon is a commune in the Lozère department in southern France.

Geography
The Chapeauroux flows east through the middle of the commune.

The Colagne has its source in the commune; with the Lac de Charpal they form most of the commune's southwestern border.

Population

See also
Communes of the Lozère department

References

Communes of Lozère